Chérancé is a commune in the Mayenne department in north-western France.

Geography
The river Oudon forms the commune's south-western border.

See also
Communes of the Mayenne department

References

Communes of Mayenne